Andrew Scott (15 February 1772 – 4 December 1846) was a Roman Catholic bishop who served as the Vicar Apostolic of the Western District of Scotland from 1832 to 1845.

He was born in Chapelford, Enzie, Banffshire on 15 February 1772. His family had been farmers at Chapelford for hundreds of years. He was ordained to the priesthood on 25 March 1795. and came to Glasgow as a missionary in 1805. 

He built St Andrew's Cathedral, Glasgow (1814–16), which still stands on the River Clyde. In Glasgow, he built schools which could be used as chapels on Sunday, and meeting places during the week. He pursued and won a libel case against a Protestant activist, the case of Scott v McGavin, 25 June 1821.

He was appointed the Coadjutor Vicar Apostolic of the Western District and Titular Bishop of Erythrae by the Holy See on 13 February 1827, and consecrated to the Episcopate at St Andrew's Cathedral, Glasgow on 21 September 1828. The principal consecrator was Bishop Alexander Paterson, Vicar Apostolic of the Eastern District of Scotland, and the principal co-consecrators were Bishop Ranald MacDonald, Vicar Apostolic of the Western District of Scotland and Bishop Thomas Penswick, Vicar Apostolic of the Northern District of England.

On the death of Bishop Ranald MacDonald on 20 September 1832, he automatically succeeded as the Vicar Apostolic of the Western District. After John Murdoch was appointed as his Coadjutor Vicar Apostolic (assistant Bishop) on 4 June 1833, Bishop Scott was able to concentrate on the Highland part of the Western District, operating from Greenock. While he had concentrated on schools in the Lowlands and Glasgow, in the western Highlands, he attempted to restore liturgy by building churches. He built new buildings at Badenoch, Bornish, Fort Augustus, Morar and Glencoe.

He resigned on 15 October 1845. The number of practising Catholics in the area increased from 1,000 to 70,000 during his forty-year tenure, largely due to Irish immigration. He died on 4 December 1846, aged 74, and was buried in St Mary's Church, Abercromby Street, Glasgow.

References

1772 births
1846 deaths
Apostolic vicars of Scotland
19th-century Roman Catholic bishops in Scotland
People from Banffshire
Scottish Roman Catholic bishops